False carrot is a common name for several plants and may refer to:

Turgenia
Yabea